Theodor Seliwanoff (or Seliwanow), born as Fedor Fedorovic Selivanov (October 8, 1859 in Gorodischtsche, Pensa–1938) was a Russian chemist who invented the Seliwanoff's test in 1887 while working in Metchnikow University of Odesa in Odesa, Ukraine.

1859 births
1938 deaths
Russian chemists